Highland Farms Inc. is a Canadian family-owned regional supermarket chain in the Greater Toronto Area. Highland Farms was founded in 1963 by brothers Charles Coppa and John Louis "Louie" Coppa, with their first location at 1558 Queen Street West in Toronto. Highland Farms grew from operating a single moderately sized grocery outlet to five locations (at its peak) across the GTA in Vaughan, Scarborough, Mississauga and North York.

The Coppa family split the company between the two brothers in 2013 with three former Highland Farms stores in North York, Vaughan, and Scarborough being rebranded as Coppa's Fresh Market under a new company owned by Louie Coppa.

The headquarters of the company is co-located with its Mississauga outlet at 50 Matheson Boulevard East, in northern Mississauga.

Locations 
The supermarket chain consists of three stores, one each in Mississauga (flagship store and head office), Scarborough and Vaughan.

See also
List of supermarket chains in Canada

References

External links
 

1963 establishments in Ontario
Companies based in Mississauga
Retail companies established in 1963
Supermarkets of Canada
Privately held companies of Canada
Canadian companies established in 1963
Family-owned companies of Canada